= Sophie Kyagulanyi =

Ugandan human rights activist

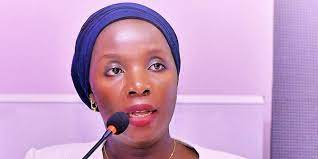
- Education: Makerere University
- Occupations: Lawyer, human rights activist

Sophie Kyagulanyi is a human rights activist and lawyer who works for Oxfam in Uganda.

== Education ==
Kyagulanyi received a Bachelor of Law, at Makerere University where she studied from 1998 to 2001.

== Career ==
Kyagulanyi worked as Democratic Governance Coordinator for Action Aid Uganda and also Women in Leadership Programme Manager at Forum for Women in Democracy. She worked as a Legal Research and Advocacy Coordinator with the Foundation for Human Rights Initiative from 2001 to 2005. Kyagulanyi is currently the Governance and Accountability Manager at Oxfam in Uganda. She was a founding member of DefendDefenders and became chairperson in 2019.

Kyagulanyi has several articles and citations. In June 2020, she wrote a blog post titled COVID19 - A reminder why access to water is a human right.
